Restiform Bodies is the second album and label debut by American alternative hip hop group Restiform Bodies. It was released on 6months in 2001. It was preceded by a limited demo release entitled Suggestion Bulletin earlier in 2001, which featured all of the same tracks except for the additional "Magic Unicorn".

Track listing

References

External links

Restiform Bodies (band) albums
2001 albums